Tahmoor Colliery is an underground coal mine at Tahmoor in the Southern Highlands region of New South Wales, Australia. It operates in the Bulli coal seam. Most of the mine product is hard coking coal used for steel making. A small quantity of steaming blend coal used for power generation is also produced. Both products are exported to Europe and Asia.

Construction of the mine was commenced by Clutha Development in 1975 with it opened in 1980 by BP that had purchased Clutha. It was sold to Conzinc Riotinto Australia in 1989, Austal Coal in 1997, Centennial Coal in 2005, Xstrata in 2007 and Glencore in 2013 and SIMEC Group in 2018.

The mine was reported in 2017 as having  of reserves and  total resource.

The colliery is connected to the Main Southern railway line via a balloon loop that opened in May 1981.

In 2013, extension of the mine was anticipated to take below a railway tunnel on the Main Southern railway line. To avoid the risk of subsidence within the tunnel, Xstrata funded the construction of a diversion around Redbank Hill to remove trains from the tunnel, which was filled with rock and sealed.

Incidents
Tahmoor Colliery has a history of outbursts where gas trapped in the coal violently escapes during mining, throwing hundreds of tonnes of coal and rock, and large amounts of suffocating gas. One miner was killed as a consequence of one of these outbursts in 1985. In 1994, it was reported that Tahmoor had recorded 89 outbursts up to April 1992. In response to that fatality, practices and equipment were upgraded, initially to provide a separately-ventilated and armoured operator cabin, and later to provide remote control.

In September 2018, two men were trapped  underground when the lift cage jammed in the mine shaft. They were uninjured, and rescued late in the evening by Fire & Rescue New South Wales.

References

BP
Coal mines in New South Wales
Former Rio Tinto (corporation) subsidiaries
Glencore
Industries of the Southern Highlands (New South Wales)
Xstrata
1980 establishments in Australia